Askaules (Greek: ἄσκαυλος from ἀσκός "bag" and αὐλός "pipe"), probably the Greek word for bag-piper, although there is no documentary authority for its use.

History
Neither *ἄσκαυλης nor ἄσκαυλος (which would naturally mean the bag-pipe) has been found in Greek classical authors, though JJ Reiske—in a note on Dio Chrysostom, Orat. lxxi. ad fin., where an unmistakable description of the bag-pipe occurs ("and they say that he is skilled to write, to work as an artist, and to play the pipe with his mouth, on the bag placed under his arm-pits")--says that ἄσκαυλος [?] was the Greek word for bag-piper. The only actual corroboration of this is the use of ascaules for the pure Latin utricularius in Martial x. 3. 8.

Dio Chrysostom flourished about AD 100; it is therefore only an assumption that the bag-pipe was known to the classical Greeks by the name of ἄσκαυλος. It need not, however, be a matter of surprise that among the highly cultured Greeks such an instrument as the bag-pipe should exist without finding a place in literature. It is significant that it is not mentioned by Pollux (Onomast. iv. 74) and Athenaeus (Deipnos. iv. 76) in their lists of the various kinds of pipes.

See also
 Aulos

References

Attribution:

Greek words and phrases
History of the bagpipes